Gold Eagle may refer to:

 Eagle (United States coin) (1792–1933)
 American Gold Eagle, a modern bullion coin
 Gold Eagle Reserve, an Indian reserve in Saskatchewan, Canada
 Gold Eagle, a publishing imprint of Harlequin Enterprises

See also
 Golden Eagle (disambiguation)